CUS Milano ("University Sports Centre of Milan") is a university sports centre founded in 1947, promoting the practice and the expansion of sport and physical education for students of all universities of Milan. CUS has 11 division teams, athletics, rugby, tennis, sailing, swimming and water polo, ice hockey, rowing, canoeing, volleyball, softball and basketball, and a number of fitness courses that are open to any student at any level.

Universities
Università Cattolica del Sacro Cuore
Bocconi University
University of Milan
University of Milan Bicocca
IULM
Politecnico di Milano

Cup of universities in Milan
The universities who have won the cup in several years:
2011/2012 Politecnico di Milano
2010/2011 Università Cattolica del Sacro Cuore
2009/2010 Università Cattolica del Sacro Cuore
2008/2009 Università Cattolica del Sacro Cuore
2007/2008 Politecnico di Milano
2006/2007 Università Cattolica del Sacro Cuore
2005/2006 University of Milan

See also
Centro Universitario Sportivo Italiano

References

External links
 Official website

Sport in Milan
Milan